István Nagy (born January 1, 1954) is a Hungarian politician, member of the National Assembly (MP) from Fidesz Budapest Regional List from 2010 to 2014. He was also a Member of Parliament from the party's National List from 2006 to 2010.

Nagy was a member of the Committee on Employment and Labour from May 30, 2006 to May 5, 2014.

Personal life
He is married and has three children.

References

1954 births
Living people
Fidesz politicians
Members of the National Assembly of Hungary (2006–2010)
Members of the National Assembly of Hungary (2010–2014)
Politicians from Budapest